Luttazzi is a surname of Italian origin. Notable people with the surname include:

 Daniele Luttazzi (born 1961), Italian actor, writer, satirist, and illustrator
 Lelio Luttazzi (1923–2010), Italian composer, television and radio presenter, musician, conductor and actor

Italian-language surnames